Acinos is a genus of ten species of annual and short-lived evergreen perennial woody plants native to southern Europe and western Asia. Its name comes from the Greek word , the name of a small aromatic plant. They are small, tufted, bushy or spreading plants growing to 10–45 cm tall. The 2-lipped, tubular flowers are in whorls borne on erect spike-like inflorescence produced in mid-summer.

Selected species
Acinos alpinus
Acinos arvensis
Acinos corsicus
Acinos rotundifolius
Acinos suaveolens
Acinos troodi

Cultivation
Mostly quite frost hardy, they will grow in poor soil as long as it is well drained (they do not like wet conditions) and need full sun.  Propagate from seed or cuttings in spring.

References

External links
Flora Europaea: Acinos

Lamiaceae
Lamiaceae genera
Taxa named by Philip Miller
Flora of the Mediterranean Basin